Davarus Shores (born April 22, 1992) is a defensive back who is a free agent. He played college football at Southern Arkansas University and Texas A&M University–Commerce.

Early years 
Shores was born and raised in Mesquite, Texas. He went to high school at Mesquite High School.

College career 

Shores began his college career in 2011 at Southern Arkansas University. As a true freshmen he notched up 16 tackles in 8 games.

After the 2011 season, Shores transferred to Texas A&M University–Commerce. He took a redshirt during the 2012 season.

During his sophomore season in 2013 he had 37 total tackles, 4 tackles for loss, 2 sacks, 1 fumble recovery, and 1 defensive touchdown, he also played in all 12 games.

During his junior season in 2014 he had 54 total tackles, 6 tackles for loss, 1 sack, 1 fumble recovery, and 4 blocked kicks. He played all 12 games for the second year in a row.

In his senior season in 2015, Shores registered 48 total tackles, 2.5 tackles for loss, 1 fumble recovery, and 3 blocked kicks. He also won Lone Star Conference (LSC) special teams player of the week twice that season and at the end of the season he was awarded LSC second team honors.

Throughout the majority of his college career he played at the rover position, which is a hybrid safety with responsibilities at both linebacker and defensive back.

NCAA statistics

Source:

Professional career 
On April 20, 2016, Davarus Shores signed a two-year contract with the BC Lions. He was released by the team on June 12, 2016.

World Games 
In July, 2017 Davarus Shores played for the United States national team at the 2017 World Games at Wroclaw, Poland.  The team lost to Germany and defeated Poland to win the bronze medal.

References

External links

1992 births
Living people
American football defensive backs
Canadian football defensive backs
African-American players of American football
African-American players of Canadian football
Southern Arkansas Muleriders football players
BC Lions players
Players of American football from Texas
People from Mesquite, Texas
World Games bronze medalists
Competitors at the 2017 World Games
21st-century African-American sportspeople